The 10th Pan American Games were held in Indianapolis, United States from 7 to 23 August 1987.

Medals

Silver

Men's High Jump: Troy Kemp
Men's Discus Throw: Bradley Cooper

Bronze

Men's Triple Jump: Frank Rutherford
Women's 100 metres: Pauline Davis-Thompson
Women's 200 metres: Pauline Davis-Thompson

Results by event

See also
Bahamas at the 1988 Summer Olympics

Nations at the 1987 Pan American Games
1987
Pan American Games